The Panama least gecko (Sphaerodactylus lineolatus) is a species of lizard in the family Sphaerodactylidae. It is endemic to Panama and Colombia.

References

Sphaerodactylus
Reptiles described in 1856